Abraham Haywood (1692–1747) was an architect who was born at Whitchurch, Shropshire and is likely to have come to Lincoln around 1720 to work for Francis Smith of Warwick on the construction of St Peter at Arches Church, Lincoln. In 1736 he built the town house of the Disney family, Disney Place in Eastgate Street, Lincoln and in 1744 the Lincoln Assembly Rooms in the Bail, Lincoln. He also built a house for himself on the east side of St Peter at Arches‘ graveyard on the site of the Lincoln Taylor's Hall. Abraham Hayward's younger brother John Hayward (1708–78), a mason by trade, also accompanied him to Lincoln. After Abraham's death, he presumably continued the business and in 1753 rebuilt St Mary's bridge in Lincoln. John Hayward's grandson, William Hayward became surveyor to Lincoln Cathedral.

Interior of the County Assembly Rooms, Bailgate by Hayward, 1744

Literature
Antram N (revised), Pevsner N & Harris J, (1989), The Buildings of England: Lincolnshire, Yale University Press. 
Colvin H. A (1995), Biographical Dictionary of British Architects 1600-1840. Yale University Press, 3rd edition London, pg.483.

References

1692 births
1747 deaths
18th-century English architects
Architects from Lincolnshire
People from Whitchurch, Shropshire
Architects from Shropshire